Ridgeway Historic District is a national historic district located at Ridgeway, Fairfield County, South Carolina.  The district encompasses 31 contributing buildings in the town of Ridgeway.  A majority of the buildings in the district were built between 1890 and 1915, the heyday of cotton production in the area. The district includes a commercial block with a predominance of simply ornamented two-story brick stores and a residential block with primarily asymmetrical, frame, weatherboarded houses lining the tree shaded streets. Styles include Queen Anne, Neo-Classical, Victorian, and Bungalow. Notable buildings include the J. Spann Edmunds House, Augustus Talley Moore House, Thomas Co. Store, Ruff Furniture Store, Dobson's Drug
Store, Ridgeway Town Hall, Ruff's Gin Shop, James Team's Drugstore, and the Charlotte and South Carolina
Railroad House.

It was listed on the National Register of Historic Places in 1980.

References

Historic districts on the National Register of Historic Places in South Carolina
Victorian architecture in South Carolina
Queen Anne architecture in South Carolina
Neoclassical architecture in South Carolina
Buildings and structures in Fairfield County, South Carolina
National Register of Historic Places in Fairfield County, South Carolina